Konstanty Majeranowski (1787–1851) was a Polish journalist, poet and writer.

1787 births
1851 deaths
Polish journalists
19th-century Polish poets